Gina Louise Breedlove is an American singer, songwriter and stage actress.

Work 
In 1997, she originated the role of Sarabi in the Broadway production of The Lion King. She has appeared in the 1987 Broadway musical Sophisticated Ladies. Breedlove sang  in 1995 with Harry Belafonte at the Orange County Performing Arts Center in Costa Mesa, where their duets on "Skin to Skin" and "How Do You Keep the Music Playing?" were praised by the Los Angeles Times. In 1996, she was part of the cast of Sheila's Day. She also contributed a song to the soundtrack of the 1997 Shaquille O'Neal film Steel.

References

External links

Official site

Year of birth missing (living people)
Living people
American stage actresses
American women singers
American women songwriters
Songwriters from New York (state)
21st-century American women